Olavi Eelis Alakulppi (17 July 1915 – 19 August 1990) was a Finnish military officer and cross-country skier.

Life and career
Alakulppi was born in Rovaniemi, Finland, to Elis and Senja Alakulppi (née Törmänen).

Alakulppi served in the Finnish Army during the Winter War and the Continuation War. In 1942, he was awarded the Mannerheim Cross.

In 1945, in order to evade prosecution for his involvement in the Weapons Cache Case, he skied to Sweden and arranged for his wife Eevi, their son Vesa, and him to travel to the United States, where he joined the United States Army. He then fought in the Korean War, and served in South Korea, Japan, and West Germany. Vesa Juhani Alakulppi eventually followed his father into the military and was killed in action during the Vietnam War.

Alakulppi retired from the US Army in 1968 as a lieutenant-colonel. He died in 1990 in Petersburg, Virginia, and is buried in the Arlington National Cemetery.

While Alakulppi served as a company commander in West Germany in the 1950s, his personal chauffeur was Elvis Presley, who was carrying out his military service.

During the late 1950s, Alakulppi requested a United Nations commission to investigate the Soviet partisan attacks as war crimes. He had personally witnessed the aftermath of the raid on Seitajärvi and submitted evidence in the form of newspaper reports and photos of the victims. However, the request was rejected and the case was not pursued further.

Alakulppi won a gold medal in the 4 ×10 km cross-country relay at the 1939 FIS Nordic World Ski Championships in Zakopane.

In literature 
Alakulppi has been the focus of several books.

Finland's 2008 War Book of the Year was awarded to non-fiction author Kari Kallonen for his work "Olavi Alakulppi, sissiluutnantti: Marskin ritari ja maailmanmestari." Kallonen is a well respected military historian and author who also won the 2016 War Book of the Year for his work "Tähtilippu talvisodassa – Amerikan Suomalaisen Legioonan tuntematon tarina."

Kallonen's 2008 book was translated into English in 2017 by Mika Roinila. The translation is entitled "Guerrilla Lieutenant – Olavi Alakulppi: Knight of the Mannerheim Cross and World Skiing Champion".

Cross-country skiing results

World Championships
 1 medal – (1 gold)

References

External links
World Championship results 
Finnish Skiers - Olympic and World Championship Results 
Arlington National Cemetery

1915 births
1990 deaths
People from Rovaniemi
People from Oulu Province (Grand Duchy of Finland)
Finnish emigrants to the United States
Finnish male cross-country skiers
Finnish military personnel of World War II
United States Army officers
FIS Nordic World Ski Championships medalists in cross-country skiing
Knights of the Mannerheim Cross
Burials at Arlington National Cemetery
20th-century American musicians
United States Army colonels
Finnish expatriates in West Germany
Finnish expatriates in Japan
Finnish expatriates in South Korea
Military personnel of the Korean War
Sportspeople from Lapland (Finland)